"When I'm Gone" is a song by American rapper Eminem from his first greatest hits album Curtain Call: The Hits (2005). It was released on December 6, 2005, the same day as the album was released, as the lead single.

"When I'm Gone" received mixed to negative reviews from music critics. The song charted at number eight on the U.S. Billboard Hot 100, number 22 on the Hot Rap Tracks chart, number four on the UK Singles Chart and on the Australian ARIA Singles Chart, the latter being the only country where it peaked at number one.

Background
“When I’m Gone” was written in 2003 and released in 2005 by Shady Records, on the album Curtain Call: The Hits. It was thought at the time that this album would mark the beginning of an extended musical hiatus for Eminem, who had said "I'm at a point in my life right now where I feel like I don't know where my career is going...This is the reason that we called it Curtain Call, because this could be the final thing. We don't know."

The song's lyrics pertain to Eminem's life as a celebrity musician interfering with his family. Eminem uses imagery to evoke a feeling of sadness about his family falling apart.

The music video for the song was directed by Anthony Mandler. Tarick Salmaci, from the TV show The Contender, makes an appearance in the video with his wife.

Critical reception
AllMusic wrote a mixed to positive overview: "There's the closing "When I'm Gone," a sentimental chapter in the Eminem domestic psychodrama that bears the unmistakable suggestion that Em is going away for a while. While it's not up to the standard of "Mockingbird," it is more fully realized than the two other new cuts here..." Pitchfork considered: "When I'm Gone" is an all desolate placeholder—lesser version of Eminem songs that already piss me off. "Gone" is the worst offender, yet another love letter from Em to daughter Hailie, it, like Encore's "Mockingbird", is heavy-handed and saccharine."

IGN also panned the single: "The latter, however, is another prime example of the beat dragging Eminem down. The sluggish, lumbering bump causes his lyrics to stumble and sound forced in their delivery. The heartfelt storyline would have been better served drenched in some warm, fuzzy, but ultimately mournful soul instead." NME called this song disappointing. Sputnik Music wrote a mixed review: "Eminem gives a powerful vocal performance, with some rather touching lyrics and a nice chorus. However, much like much of his previous work on Encore, it gets bogged down in a repetitive and boring beat." Rolling Stone agreed.

Music video
The music video starts with Eminem rapping on a podium about his life at a small gathering. He's at an open house where he completely ignores his daughter's creations but before he can see the error of his actions, it is too late. As he watches her walk away, he raps "Then turn right around in that song and tell her you love her/And put hands on her mother, who's a spitting image of her", feeling remorse for writing songs about being violent towards Kim, who is Hailie's mother, and wonders how he could be a good parent.

Then, he is confronted by his daughter piling boxes in front of the door to prevent him from leaving. He convinces his daughter to let him go but she insists to give him a necklace with her picture. He then finds himself in a hotel room and then on a stage where he raps. At the end of his performance on the stage, he finds his daughter has followed him and tells him of the divorce.

Afterwards, Eminem goes backstage as the "bad" Slim Shady and looks in a mirror. He then punches it as a way of "killing" Slim Shady, a reference to his debut EP as the character.  He then finds himself back at home playing with his daughters on the swing. The video ends with him being applauded at the podium.

The video features actresses playing his daughter Hailie Jade and his ex-wife Kim, from whom Eminem was divorced when the song was released. Hailie's half sibling Stevie Laine Scott, Kim's child to another man, also appears in the video played by an actress near the end of the video.   Eminem adopted Stevie and thinks of them as his own child. They’re the younger kid on the swing, at the moment in the lyrics when he says, "Hailie just smiles and winks at her little sister". The scene where he performs onstage is the cover art for the single and Curtain Call album.

Track listing
Digital download

UK CD single

German CD single

Notes
 signifies an additional producer.

Charts

Weekly charts

Year-end charts

Certifications

References

External links

2005 singles
Eminem songs
Music videos directed by Anthony Mandler
Number-one singles in Australia
Song recordings produced by Eminem
Shady Records singles
Aftermath Entertainment singles
Interscope Records singles
Songs written by Luis Resto (musician)
Songs about parenthood
2005 songs